STS-62-A was a planned NASA Space Shuttle mission to deliver a reconnaissance payload (Teal Ruby) into polar orbit. It was expected to use Discovery. It would have been the first crewed launch from Vandenberg Air Force Base, California, and the first crewed mission to go into polar orbit. The mission designation, STS-62-A, meant: 6=fiscal year 1986, 2=Vandenberg (1=Kennedy Space Center), and A=first flight in that fiscal year.

Crew

Post-Challenger accident 
The destruction of Challenger and subsequent halt of the Space Shuttle program led to the cancellation of the mission.

Guy Gardner, Jerry Ross, and Mike Mullane were members of the second post-Challenger mission STS-27 — a classified mission for the DoD — during which the Lacrosse-1 radar reconnaissance spacecraft was allegedly deployed.

References

External links 
 STS-62-A mission patch draft designs
 Article on the Teal Ruby satellite that would have been STS-62-A's payload
 National Museum of the United States Air Force page on Teal Ruby

Cancelled Space Shuttle missions
1986 in spaceflight